Another Polka Celebration is an album by Eddie Blazonczyk. In 1986, the album won Blazonczyk the Grammy Award for Best Polka Recording.

See also
 Polka in the United States

References

External links
Eddie Blazonczyk's Versatones

1986 albums
Grammy Award for Best Polka Album